Edward Vaughan (died 5 December 1718), of Glan-y-Llyn, Merionethshire and Llwydiarth, Montgomeryshire, was a Welsh Tory politician who sat in the English and British House of Commons for 43 years from 1675 to 1718. He was briefly Father of the House.

Vaughan was the eldest son of Howel Vaughan of Glan-y-Llyn, Merioneth and his wife Elizabeth Jones, daughter of Humphrey Jones of Ddol, Flintshire. He inherited from his wife's uncle Edward Vaughan MP, the estates of Llwydiarth and Llangedwyn, Denbighshire in 1661 and succeeded his father in 1669. He married  Mary Purcell, daughter of John Purcell, MP of Nantcribba in 1672.

Vaughan was appointed a deputy lieutenant of Montgomeryshire and Merionethshire from 1674 to 1688, for Merionethshire from 1689 to ?1696, and for Montgomeryshire from 1701 to ?death. He was High Sheriff of Montgomeryshire for Jan-Nov 1688 and Custos Rotulorum of Merionethshire from 1711 to ?1714.

Vaughan was returned as Member of Parliament (MP) for Montgomeryshire at general elections in March 1679, October 1679, 1681, 1685, 1689, 1690, 1695, 1698, February 1701, December 1701, 1702, 1705, 1708, 1710, 1713 and 1715.

Vaughan died in December 1718. He had two daughters and one son, who predeceased him. His property went to  his son-in-law, Watkin Williams Wynn who married his daughter Ann.

References

17th-century births
1718 deaths
17th-century Welsh politicians
People from Montgomeryshire
Members of the Parliament of England (pre-1707) for constituencies in Wales
English MPs 1679
English MPs 1680–1681
English MPs 1681
English MPs 1685–1687
English MPs 1689–1690
English MPs 1690–1695
English MPs 1695–1698
English MPs 1698–1700
English MPs 1701
English MPs 1701–1702
English MPs 1702–1705
English MPs 1705–1707
British MPs 1707–1708
British MPs 1708–1710
British MPs 1710–1713
British MPs 1713–1715
British MPs 1715–1722
Members of the Parliament of Great Britain for Welsh constituencies
High Sheriffs of Montgomeryshire
Deputy Lieutenants of Montgomeryshire
Deputy Lieutenants of Merionethshire